Lattke is a German surname. Notable people with the surname include:

, myrmecologist
Michael Lattke (born 1942), German scholar of the New Testament and early Christianity
Martin Lattke (born 1981), German tenor

German-language surnames